EMSAT may refer to:
Empresa Metropolitana de Servicios y Administración del Transporte (Quito)
The Encyclopedia of Materials: Science And Technology. See Elsevier.
The Emirates Standardized Test (EmSAT)